Pļaviņas Municipality is a former municipality in Vidzeme, Latvia. The municipality was formed in 2009 by merging Aiviekste parish, Klintaine parish, Vietalva parish and Pļaviņas town the administrative centre being Pļaviņas. The population in 2020 was 4,808.

On 1 July 2021, Pļaviņas Municipality ceased to exist and its territory was merged into Aizkraukle Municipality.

See also 
 Lokstene Shrine of Dievturi
 Administrative divisions of Latvia (2009)

References 

 
Former municipalities of Latvia